Dichloroethene or dichloroethylene, often abbreviated as DCE, can refer to any one of several isomeric forms of the organochloride with the molecular formula C2H2Cl2:

There are three isomers:
1,1-Dichloroethene
1,2-Dichloroethene (E and Z)

See also
Dichloroethane

Chloroalkenes